Christina Rosca (born July 25, 1997) is an American tennis player.

Rosca has a career-high singles ranking by the WTA of 499, achieved on 19 December 2022. She also has a career-high WTA doubles ranking of 167, achieved on 31 October 2022.

Rosca won her first major ITF Circuit title at the 2022 Mercer Tennis Classic, in the doubles draw partnering Anna Rogers.

Rosca played college tennis at Vanderbilt University.

ITF finals

Doubles: 17 (10 titles, 6 runner-ups, 1 not played)

Notes

References

External links

1997 births
Living people
American female tennis players
People from Princeton, New Jersey
Vanderbilt Commodores women's tennis players
Tennis people from New Jersey
21st-century American women